Longzha is a historic Yao ethnic township located in the extreme south of Yanling County, Hunan, China. As a historic division of Yanling, Longzha was originally a part of Dingzhi Township (定治乡) in 1949. Longzha Yao Ethnic Township was created in August 1958, it was reorganized as a production brigade of Longzha (龙渣大队) in Zhongcun Commune in 1958, and reorganized as a village of Longzha (龙渣村) in Zhongcun Township in 1984. Dividing four villages in southern Zhongcun Township, Longzha Yao Ethnic Township was re-established in February 1985. On November 20, 2015, With Zhongcun Township and Pingle Township, Longzha was merged to the new Zhongcun Yao Ethnic Township.

References

Historic township-level divisions of Yanling County
Yao ethnic townships